Kaše is a Czech surname. Notable people with the surname include:

 Ondřej Kaše, Czech ice hockey player
 David Kaše, Czech ice hockey player
 Max Kase, American writer and newspaper editor

See also
Kase (disambiguation)

Czech-language surnames